The 2015–16 Euroleague Regular Season was played from 15 October to 18 December 2015. A total of 24 teams competed in the group stage to decide the 16 places in the Top 16.

Format
In each group, teams played against each other home-and-away in a round-robin format. The matchdays were 15–16 October, 22–23 October, 29–30 October, 5–6 November, 12–13 November, 19–20 November, 26–27 November, 3–4 December, 10–11 December and 17–18 December 2015.

The four first qualified teams advanced to the Top 16, while the fifth and the sixth-placed teams entered the Eurocup Last 32.

A total of 12 countries were represented in the group stage. Pınar Karşıyaka and Darüşşafaka Doğuş made their debut appearances in the group stage of the modern era of Euroleague Basketball.

Tiebreakers
If teams are level on record at the end of the Regular Season, tiebreakers are applied in the following order:
 Head-to-head record.
 Head-to-head point differential.
 Point differential during the Regular Season.
 Points scored during the regular season.
 Sum of quotients of points scored and points allowed in each Regular Season match.

Groups

Group A

Group B

Group C

Group D

External links
Official website

2015–16 Euroleague